Mikhail Varshavski (born November 13, 1989), known professionally as Doctor Mike, is a Soviet-born American Internet personality, family physician, and amateur boxer. His Instagram account went viral after he was featured in BuzzFeed and People magazine named him The Sexiest Doctor Alive in 2015. He has a YouTube channel for medically themed entertainment and information.

Early life 
Varshavski was born on November 12, 1989, in Saransk, Russian SFSR, to a Jewish family. His father, both Jewish and Ukrainian, was a physician and a graduate of the Third Medical Institute of Moscow, while his mother was a mathematics professor. When he was six, he and his family immigrated to Brooklyn, New York. In Brooklyn, his mother worked sweeping floors for minimum wage, while his father attended medical school for the second time.

Varshavski was given the nickname "Doctor Mike" during his high school years by friends who came to him for sports-related injuries. After seeing his father's relationship with his patients, Varshavski wanted to become a doctor. He enrolled in the New York Institute of Technology and was accepted for an accelerated, seven-year combined track for a bachelor's degree in life sciences and a medical degree (Doctor of Osteopathic Medicine) upon completion of the undergraduate program. In 2014, he started residency at Atlantic Health System's Overlook Medical Center’s Family Medicine program, which he completed in 2017. During his first year in the program, his mother died of leukemia, and he decided to move back in with his father.

Career 

In early 2012, Varshavski joined Instagram to document his life as a medical student and combat the notion that "you can't have a life in medical school".

Varshavski gained media attention in August 2015 when BuzzFeed published an article about him titled "Um, You Really Need To See This Hot Doctor And His Dog" that highlighted his good looks and his relationship with his dog, a husky named Roxy. That November, People magazine named him "the Sexiest Doctor Alive" in its Sexiest Man Alive issue, popularizing his Instagram account.

Varshavski uses his social media to provide health information to millennials.

In 2017, a year after he launched his YouTube channel, Varshavski gave a TEDx Talk on "The epidemic of the 'I Know It All' expert" at a TEDxMonteCarlo event. The video of that speech has been viewed more than 3 million times. In 2018, after his residency, he joined Chatham Family Medicine, a family practice with Atlantic Health System, in Chatham, New Jersey.

COVID-19 pandemic 
During the COVID-19 pandemic, Varshavski reconfigured his YouTube videos to answer people's questions about the virus. Varshavski debunked many of Judy Mikovits' claims about COVID-19 from the conspiracy film, Plandemic. In March 2020, Varshavski interviewed Anthony Fauci, director of the National Institute of Allergy and Infectious Diseases (NIAID), about the pandemic.

On November 12, 2020, for his 31st birthday, Varshavski traveled to Miami to attend a beach party that was also attended by a number of other people without masks, during the COVID-19 pandemic. Footage of the event was posted on Instagram and went viral, particularly on Reddit. On November 18, Varshavski apologized for his actions in a YouTube video, saying he "messed up" and he needed "to do better." His attendance of the party was criticized by medical professionals. Bioethicist Arthur Caplan, director of the division of medical ethics at NYU Langone Health, said Varshavski "fails completely in being an appropriate role model and he should be called out, and he deserves even more criticism than he's getting so far."

Boxing career 
Varshavski made his amateur boxing debut in May 2022 against influencer iDubbbz as the headline fight in the Creator Clash boxing event. He won his match against iDubbbz in a unanimous decision. 

Varshavski made his professional debut against Chris Avila on the undercard of Jake Paul vs. Anderson Silva. He lost the fight via unanimous decision.

Personal Life 
He previously dated Miss Universe 2015 Pia Wurtzbach.

Philanthropy

In late 2015, Varshavski established a foundation, Limitless Tomorrow, to provide scholarships to students, and he has raised money for it by auctioning experiences with himself through his social media accounts. In January 2016, the dating app Coffee Meets Bagel collaborated in a $10 raffle for a date with Varshavski; the campaign raised $91,000 for his foundation.

In July 2019, Varshavski spread awareness for the humanitarian organization, Save a Child's Heart, by posting a photo with the organization's 5,000th patient while on a trip to Israel.

In March 2020, Varshavski donated $50,000 worth of N95 masks in the face of shortages for medical personnel due to the COVID-19 pandemic.

In late March 2022, Varshavski set up a donation to GlobalGiving for Ukrainian people during the Russian invasion of Ukraine.

In June 2022, Varshavski donated $100,111 to Feeding America, through a fundraiser organized by YouTuber Ryan Trahan.

Boxing record

Professional

Exhibition

Awards and nominations 
Varshavski won the 2020 Webby Awards for Education & Discovery, as well as for Health & Fitness in the category Social.

References

External links 
 

1989 births
20th-century American Jews
21st-century American Jews
21st-century American physicians
American osteopathic physicians
American people of Russian-Jewish descent
American people of Ukrainian-Jewish descent
American YouTubers
YouTube boxers
Celebrity doctors
Educational and science YouTubers
Jewish physicians
Living people
New York Institute of Technology alumni
People from Saransk
Philanthropists from New York (state)
Russian emigrants to the United States
Russian YouTubers
Soviet Jews
21st-century Russian physicians
Physicians from New Jersey